The Annemie is a windmill located on the Boschdijk 1006 in Eindhoven, in the province of North Brabant, Netherlands. Built in 1891 on an artificial hill, the windmill functioned as a gristmill. The mill is a national monument (nr 14637) since 15 August 1972.

History
The Annemie was built in 1891 by Antonius van Himbergen from Bladel, who also built De Roosdonck in Nuenen, which also used to function as a gristmill. In 1957, the mill was refurnished as a house, and the inner workings were removed, though main parts like the central axis and wheel were kept. In 1991, the mill was restored, and after consecutive maintenance works between 2005 and 2019, the mill is presently in reasonable condition. The Annemie is privately owned and used as living accommodations as well as an office, so visits are not possible.

Gallery

See also
Annemieke, a Dutch feminine given name

References

External links
Chris Kolman [et al.], Annemie in: Monumenten in Nederland - Noord-Brabant, Rijksdienst voor de Monumentenzorg/ Waanders Uitgevers, Zeist/Zwolle, 1997, p. 153

Windmills in North Brabant
Rijksmonuments in North Brabant
Buildings and structures in Eindhoven